Li Ji (born July 9, 1986 in Yunnan) is a female Chinese freestyle swimmer who competed in the 2004 Summer Olympics.

She won the silver medal as part of the Chinese 4×200 m freestyle relay team. She only competed in the heats, but was also awarded with a silver medal.

External links
 profile 

1986 births
Living people
Swimmers from Yunnan
Olympic swimmers of China
Swimmers at the 2004 Summer Olympics
Olympic silver medalists for China
Chinese female freestyle swimmers
Medalists at the 2004 Summer Olympics
Olympic silver medalists in swimming
21st-century Chinese women